Stradun may refer to:
Stradun (street), the main street in Dubrovnik, Croatia
Straduń, a village in Poland